Jules Henri Saiset  (July 11, 1925 – July 12, 1995) was a French existentialist philosopher, dramatist, novelist, and critic.

Saiset was born in Paris.  When he was 15 months old, his father died of a fever.

1925 births
1995 deaths
Writers from Paris
20th-century French novelists